San Antolín de la Dóriga is one of 28 parishes (administrative divisions) in Salas, a municipality within the province and autonomous community of Asturias, in northern Spain.

References 

Parishes in Salas